2018 Magyar Kupa may refer to the following competitions in Hungary:
2018 Magyar Kupa (men's basketball)
2018 Magyar Kupa (men's water polo)
2018 Magyar Kupa (women's water polo)
2018 Magyar Kupa Final, a men's football match